Marvellous Year is a 2009 album by New Zealand songwriter Don McGlashan and The Seven Sisters.

The album was recorded at Neil Finn's Roundhead Studios in Auckland, and featured Finn on backing vocals on two tracks, "18th Day" and "C2006P1 (Make Yourself at Home)".

The title is drawn from a line in the Allen Curnow poem "The Skeleton of the Great Moa in the Canterbury Museum, Christchurch":
"Not I, some child, born in a marvellous year,
Will learn the trick of standing upright here."

"Bathe in the River" had appeared originally on the soundtrack to the film No. 2, where it had been sung by Hollie Smith. The song won the APRA Silver Scroll in 2006. The closing track, "The Colossus of Roadies", is from a stage show McGlashan worked on with Toa Fraser, director of No. 2.

Track listing
(All songs by Don McGlashan)
 "The Switch" – 4:29
 "Bad Blood" – 5:42
 "Not Ready" – 4:14
 "You're the Song" – 4:21
 "Everything's Broken; Life's So Sweet" – 3:58
 "18th Day" – 6:16
 "Marvellous Year" – 4.42
 "Radio Programmer" – 3:33
 "C2006P1 (Make Yourself at Home)" – 3:05
 "Bathe in the River" – 5:20
 "Theme From 'The Colossus of Roadies'" – 2:42

Personnel
 Don McGlashan – vocals, guitars, piano, French horn, euphonium, vibraphone, glockenspiel, mandolin, DM100, bells, backing vocals
 Dominic Blaazer – electric piano, Hammond organ, theremin, moog synthesizer, mandolin, backing vocals
 Chris O'Connor – drums, percussion, hand drum, shaker, backing vocals
 Maree Thom – bass, cello, accordion, backing vocals
 John Segovia – electric guitars, slide guitar, pedal steel guitar, dobro, backing vocals

Additional personnel
 Sean Donnelly – bass ("Not Ready")
 Neil Finn – backing vocals ("18th Day", "C2006P1")
 Kingsley Melhuich – trumpet ("C2006P1")
 Haydn Godfrey – trombone ("C2006P1")
 Strings on "Not Ready": Ashley Brown, Miranda Adams, Justine Cormack, Christine Bowie

References

External links
 Marvellous Year press release [pdf]

Don McGlashan albums
2009 albums
Albums recorded at Roundhead Studios